Agnew is a surname. Notable people with the surname include:
 Alex Agnew (born 1973), Belgian stand-up comedian
 Billy Agnew (1898-?), Scottish football player
 Chloë Agnew (born 1989), Irish singer
 Crispin Agnew of Lochnaw (born 1944), 11th baronet, QC
 David Agnew, BBC television drama pen name
 David Agnew (footballer) (1925–1966), Northern Irish footballer
 David Hayes Agnew (1818–1892), American surgeon
 Frank Agnew (born 1964), American punk rock musician
 Fraser Agnew, Northern Irish politician
 Gary Agnew (born 1960), Canadian hockey coach
 Sir Geoffrey Agnew (1908–1986), British art dealer
 George Agnew (Australian politician), Member of the Queensland Legislative Assembly 1883–1896.
 George B. Agnew (1868–1941), New York politician
 Harold Agnew (1921–2013) American physicist
 Jamal Agnew (born 1995), American football player
 James Agnew (1815–1901), Australian politician
 James Agnew (British Army officer) (died 1777), killed in the American Revolution
 Jaylyn Agnew (born 1997), American basketball player
 Jeff Agnew (born 1965), American stock car racing driver
 Jim Agnew (born 1966), American hockey player
 John Agnew (Prince Edward Island politician) (1854-?)
 John A. Agnew (born 1949), British-American political geographer
 John Hume Agnew (1863–1908), Canadian politician
 Jonathan Agnew (born 1960), English cricket broadcaster and former professional cricketer
 Judy Agnew, (1921–2012), Second Lady of the United States
 Lee Agnew (born 1971), Scottish drummer and percussionist
 Liam Agnew (born 1995), English footballer
 Lindsay Agnew (born 1995), Canadian footballer
 Paddy Agnew (Irish republican) (born 1955)
 Paddy Agnew (Stormont MP) (1878 – fl. 1958), early 20th-century Irish politician
 Paul Agnew (born 1964), Scottish operatic tenor
 Pete Agnew (born 1947), bassist for the rock band Nazareth
 Peter Garnett Agnew (1900–1990), British Royal Naval officer and politician
 Ralph Palmer Agnew, American mathematician
 Ray Agnew (born 1967), American football player
 Ray Agnew III (born 1991), American football player
 Rikk Agnew (born 1958), American guitarist
 Robert Agnew (1899–1983), American movie actor
 Roy Agnew (1891–1944), Australian composer and pianist
 Sam Agnew, nicknamed "Slam", professional baseball player
 Scott Agnew (born 1987), Scottish footballer
 Spiro Agnew (1918–1996), 39th vice president of the United States
 Steve Agnew (born 1965), British soccer player and coach
 Steven Agnew (born 1979), Green Party politician in Northern Ireland
 Stuart Agnew (born 1949), UKIP MEP for the East of England
 Todd Agnew (born 1971), Christian musician and songwriter
 Troy Agnew (1890-?), American baseball player and manager
 Vince Agnew (born 1987), American football player
 William Agnew (footballer) (1879–1936), Scottish football player
 William Agnew RN officer

See also
 Clan Agnew
Agnew Gold Mine

Surnames of British Isles origin
Surnames of English origin
Surnames of Irish origin
Surnames of Scottish origin